The Puente Formation is a geologic formation in California. It preserves fossils dating back to the middle to upper Miocene epoch of the Neogene period.

See also

 List of fossiliferous stratigraphic units in California
 Paleontology in California

References

 

Neogene California